"Through the Barricades" is a song by English new wave band Spandau Ballet, released as the second single from their 1986 fifth studio album of the same name. The song entered the UK Singles Chart on 8 November 1986 and became the band's tenth and final top-10 single, peaking at number six and spending a total of 10 weeks on the chart.

Background
A song about love prevailing throughout the violence and sectarianism of the Troubles, the song was inspired by the murder of Thomas Reilly, who had worked for the band, by a British soldier in Belfast during the Troubles on 9 August 1983. In 2015, songwriter Gary Kemp spoke to the Belfast Telegraph about his inspiration for it:

"We had a guy called 'Kidso' (Thomas Reilly), who worked for us on merchandise during the True tour. He went back to Belfast after the tour and was killed. Kidso's brother, Jim, who played drums for Stiff Little Fingers, subsequently took me along to see his grave and the song was inspired by walking down the Falls Road. I got to experience some of the emotion of that first-hand and it just stuck with me. I didn't expect it to come out in the shape of a Romeo and Juliet sort of song, but it did."

The lyric "it's a terrible beauty we've made" alludes to W. B. Yeats's poem "Easter, 1916", about the Irish Easter Rising. Accepting his award for Outstanding Song Collection at the 2012 Ivor Novello Awards, Kemp singled it out as a particular favourite of his, stating: Through the Barricades' is one I'm really close to." Tony Hadley said that he considers it to be the band's best song.

Reception and legacy
The song, which is in the form of an acoustic ballad, has been described by AllMusic as "the best song by far" on its album. However, Ian Gittins was critical of the song in The Guardian, describing it as "one of Spandau's more ponderous, clunky numbers."

Tony Hadley performed the song as part of his three-song set in the final of ITV reality show Reborn in the USA in 2003, which saw him win the public vote against Michelle Gayle.

Charts

Weekly charts

Year-end charts

Certifications

References

1986 songs
1986 singles
1980s ballads
Spandau Ballet songs
CBS Records singles
British soft rock songs
Epic Records singles
Number-one singles in Italy
Song recordings produced by Gary Langan
Songs about The Troubles (Northern Ireland)
Songs written by Gary Kemp